St. James Episcopal Church is a parish of the Diocese of Iowa located in Oskaloosa, Iowa, United States. It was listed on the National Register of Historic Places in 1991.

History
The parish was begun on May 27, 1855, and it was incorporated in August 1857. A lot was bought for a church on South Market Street, the location of the Oskaloosa Public Library, but it was exchanged for the corner lot at First Ave East and South Third Street. A Gothic Revival style church and a rectory were built on the property in 1869 for $12,000. It was a frame structure that measured , and it was consecrated on November 20, 1870.

The church building was moved to the back of the property in 1896 in preparation for the construction of the present church in 1900. Frank E. Wetherell, a parishioner, designed the Late Gothic Revival style building. It was built of brick with a bell tower by Henry Wetherell for $20,000. The new church was consecrated on February 2, 1902. The old church is attached to the south side of the new church, and it is veneered in brick. The congregation worshiped without an organ until 1920 when $2,500 was raised to purchase one.

The  tower holds 10 bells that were given by Alice Williams Bennett in memory of her parents Micajah and Virginia Williams. The tower was severely damaged by lighting in 1927 and had to be rebuilt.

The church's interior features an oak carved altar, lectern, pulpit, rood screen, and altar rail. Stained glass windows line the east and west walls. The original frame church was renovated in the 1950s for classrooms, office space, and a children's chapel. In 1985 a pipe organ, which had been built for a church in Bloomer, Wisconsin in 1930, was purchased a rebuilt in the church. It contains 1,126 pipes. A new oak altar was built in 1993 so the priest can face the congregation during the service. It was consecrated on March 29, 1994. The original church was remodeled again in 2001 to create a new fellowship hall. While it was air-conditioned at the time the rest of the church building was air-conditioned in 2004.

References

External links

 St. James’ Parish web site

Churches completed in 1901
Gothic Revival church buildings in Iowa
Episcopal church buildings in Iowa
Churches in Mahaska County, Iowa
National Register of Historic Places in Mahaska County, Iowa
Churches on the National Register of Historic Places in Iowa
Religious organizations established in 1855
Oskaloosa, Iowa
1855 establishments in Iowa